The mountain oriole (Oriolus percivali), is a species of bird in the family Oriolidae.  It is found in central and eastern Africa from eastern Democratic Republic of Congo to central Kenya and western Tanzania.
Its natural habitats are subtropical or tropical moist montane forests.

Taxonomy and systematics
The mountain oriole has been considered by some authorities to be a subspecies of the black-headed oriole or the black-winged oriole. Alternate names for the mountain oriole include the black-tailed oriole, montane oriole and Percival's oriole.

References

mountain oriole
Birds of East Africa
mountain oriole
Taxonomy articles created by Polbot